Euthemia, phonetically transliterated as Efthymia, is a Greek female given name, meaning "of a good disposition".

It is derived from the ancient Greek words ευ (good) and θυμός (disposition). The diminutive Effie is a pet form of Euthemia.

Greek feminine given names